Common glider may refer to:

Tramea loewii, a dragonfly in the family Libellulidae found in Oceania
Cymothoe caenis, a butterfly in the family Nymphalidae found in Africa
Neptis sappho, a butterfly in the family Nymphalidae found in Europe and Asia

See also
Glider (disambiguation)

Animal common name disambiguation pages